The Earth Prize is an environmental sustainability prize for secondary education students awarded by The Earth Foundation every year. The Earth Prize was first launched on September 1st, 2021 and awarded on March 25th, 2022. The winner receives USD 100,000, to be shared between the team members and their school or educational program. Three runner-up finalists are rewarded with USD 25,000 each for their schools or educational programs. An educator and mentor participating in the competition are also recognized with a USD 12,500 award each. The Earth Prize is presented by the Swiss nonprofit organization The Earth Foundation, founded by Peter McGarry and directed by Angela McCarthy, who serves as CEO.

2022 Award Winners and Finalists
In the 2022 edition of The Earth Prize, ten teams of teenage students from Armenia, Great Britain, Vietnam, Switzerland, Taiwan, Canada, the United Arab Emirates, South Korea, Jamaica, and Kenya advanced to the final phase of the competition, including students from Eton College (Great Britain).

The Earth Prize 2022 Awards Ceremony took place virtually on March 25th, 2022. Team Adorbsies, a team of three teenage girls from Vietnam who proposed the idea for a biodegradable sanitary pad made out of dragon fruit waste, was announced as the first-ever winner of the competition.

References

External links 

Environmental awards
International awards